Philip Porter may refer to:

 Philip S. Porter (1925–2011), American martial artist
 Philip Thomas Porter (1930–2011), electrical engineer